Abraham Yakin (31 July 1924 – 10 May 2020) was an Israeli artist.

Background 
Abraham Yakin was born in Jerusalem. During the Second World War, he joined the Royal Navy and served three years in the Mediterranean Fleet. During this time he became acquainted with the art of Egypt, Greece, France and Italy. After the war, he returned to Jerusalem and joined the Haganah. At the same time, he started his artistic training at Bezalel Academy, where he studied with Jacob Steinhardt and Mordecai Ardon.

With Israel's declaration of independence, Yakin joined the Israel Defense Forces. He resumed his studies in 1950, and he had his first exhibition in 1953. In 1957 he married Hannah, an artist who had recently immigrated from the Netherlands. The couple divided their time between raising eight children, teaching art in Jerusalem, and exhibiting extensively in Israel, Europe and the United States.

In 1961 Abraham Yakin won the international Adolphe Neumann Prize in Paris. Works of Yakin are in the Israel Museum, Jerusalem, the Musee d'Art Juif, Paris, and several museums in the Netherlands.

See also
Visual arts in Israel

References

External links
Official website

1924 births
2020 deaths
People from Jerusalem
Israeli painters
Israeli etchers
Israeli people of Egyptian-Jewish descent
Israeli people of Syrian-Jewish descent
Israeli sculptors
Israeli watercolourists
Haganah members
Jewish painters
Modern painters